This is a list of colleges and universities in the United States and Canada that field squash as a varsity sport or a club sport and are members of the College Squash Association (CSA). There will be 33 varsity programs and 35 club teams for the 2019–20 season. Conference affiliations are current for the upcoming season. All varsity teams and most club teams compete in the annual College National Team Championships in February, which consists of 8 playoff divisions of 8 teams each as of 2020. The top 8 teams compete for the Potter Cup while the next 8 teams compete for the Hoehn Cup. The two most prominent conferences that sponsor and have full participation in college squash are the Ivy League and the New England Small College Athletic Conference (NESCAC). Schools of every conference compete together regularly. Trinity Bantams and Harvard Crimson have dominated the top division.  These two schools have combined to win 33 of the past 40 titles since 1980.

College squash schools

- Club Team (competes against varsity teams as well)
- Defunct Club Teams include William & Mary (2022), USC (2022), UCLA (2022), Kenyon (2022), Bryant (2022), Wisconsin (2022), Xavier (2022), Brandeis University (2019), Babson College (2018), University of Washington (2017), University of Miami (2016), Penn State (2016), University of Oregon (2016), Charleston (2015), Ithaca (2015), Illinois-Springfield (2013), University of Vermont (2012), University of Maryland (2012), University of Illinois (2012), Purdue (2011), Tulane (2010), Roger Williams College (2008), Rutgers (2007), UC-Davis (2007), Air Force (2007), Utah (2005), Ohio Wesleyan (2004), Army West Point (1998)

- Defunct Varsity Teams include Brown University (2021), George Washington University (2021), Smith College (2015), Wellesley College (2017)

Arizona
 Arizona State University

California

 Stanford University
 University of California, Berkeley

Connecticut

 Connecticut College
 Trinity College
 University of Connecticut
 Wesleyan University 
 Yale University

Illinois

 University of Chicago
 Northwestern University

Indiana

 University of Indiana
 University of Notre Dame

Maine

 Bates College
 Bowdoin College
 Colby College

Maryland

 Johns Hopkins University
 United States Naval Academy

Massachusetts

 Amherst College
 Boston College
 Boston University
 Harvard University
 Massachusetts Institute of Technology
 Mount Holyoke College
 Northeastern University
 Smith College
 Tufts University
 Wellesley College
 Williams College

Michigan

 University of Michigan

Missouri

 Washington University in St. Louis

New Hampshire

 Dartmouth College

New Jersey

 Princeton University

New York

 Bard College 
 Colgate University
 Columbia University 
 Cornell University 
 Fordham University 
 Hamilton College
 Hobart and William Smith Colleges
 New York University
 University of Rochester
 St. Lawrence University
 Vassar College

North Carolina

 Davidson College
 Duke University
 North Carolina State University
 University of North Carolina

Ohio

 Denison University 

Ontario

 University of Western Ontario

Pennsylvania

 Bucknell University
 Carnegie Mellon University
 Chatham University
 Dickinson College
 Drexel University 
 Franklin & Marshall College
 Haverford College
 Lafayette College
 Lehigh University
 University of Pennsylvania
 Swarthmore College

Rhode Island

 Brown University 

Vermont
 
 Middlebury College

Virginia
 
 University of Richmond 
 University of Virginia
 Washington & Lee University

Washington, D.C.

 Georgetown University
 George Washington University

Map

Notes

References

External links

College squash teams in the United States